Orlando Luz and Rafael Matos were the defending champions but chose not to defend their title.

Gijs Brouwer and Christian Harrison won the title after defeating Diego Hidalgo and Cristian Rodríguez 4–6, 7–5, [10–6] in the final.

Seeds

Draw

References

External links
 Main draw

Tallahassee Tennis Challenger - Doubles
2022 Doubles